The following is a list of Black Sea incidents involving Russia and Ukraine since 2003 with the Tuzla Island conflict and is followed by the Annexation of Crimea by the Russian Federation, part of the Ukrainian crisis.

2003 
In October 2003, Russia started to build a dam from the Taman Peninsula towards the Tuzla island in Ukraine (near Crimea) without any preliminary consultations with the Ukrainian government. After the construction of the 3.8 km long dam was stopped at the Russian-Ukrainian border. The construction of the dam caused the increased intensity of stream in the strait and deterioration of the Ukrainian Tuzla island. To save the island from deterioration, the Ukrainian authorities financed ground works to deepen the bed of the strait.

The aim for the building a dam by Russia was to stop Russian ships from having to pay a toll to Ukraine while crossing the Strait of Kerch, which is considered as territorial waters of Ukraine.

In late 2003, Ukraine and Russia agreed on that the strait of Kerch became shared internal waters of both countries. The tensions ended in 2014 after Russia annexed the Crimean peninsula.

2015 
On June 3, the Ukrainian frigate Hetman Sahaydachniy detected the Russian frigate Ladny, which was on a reconnaissance mission near the territorial waters of Ukraine. Moreover, the ship was on the way to interfere with shipping in the area. The Ukrainian Navy mobilised the cutter Pryluky and the harbor minesweeper Henichensk, an Mi-14 helicopter, and the cutter Mykolaiv of the Maritime Border Guard. Ladny was forced to cancel operations and sailed back.

2017 
On January 27, 2017, the Ukrainian diving support vessel Pochaiv was hit by sniper fire from the Tavrida drilling platform, originally operated by Chernomorneftegaz, being seized by Russian forces in 2014.

On February 1, 2017, a Ukrainian Navy An-26 transport aircraft came under small arms fire from Russian military personnel, stationed on a drill rig, while flying over the Odesa gas field in the Black Sea.  This gas field is located within Ukraine's exclusive economic zone, not off the Crimean peninsula, which is also part of Ukraine's EEZ.  While the rig in question has not been named, it was amongst those stolen by Russian forces in the aftermath of the annexation of Crimea.  According to the Ukrainian military, the aircraft was on a training flight and was hit by small caliber shells.

2018 
On 21 September 2018, a Russian Su-27 fighter, from the Russian-occupied territory of Crimea, created the preconditions for an emergency in the air, approaching dangerously closely distance an An-26 military transport aircraft of the Ukrainian Naval Forces, which was executing a scheduled task above the Black Sea. On 25 September 2018 during the Volia-2018 Ukrainian strategic command and staff exercises, Russian Su-27 fighter jet's dangerous flyby over Ukrainian warships.

On 25 November 2018 three Ukrainian navy vessels which attempted to redeploy from the Black Sea port Odessa to the Sea of Azov port Berdyansk were damaged and captured by the Russian FSB security service during the Kerch Strait incident.

2019 
In the summer of 2019, Russia blocked many areas without having first filed any such requests, thus interrupting navigation and nearly blocking international shipping to and from Georgia, Bulgaria, Romania and Ukraine. On July 24, Russia blocked off 120 thousand square kilometers—nearly 25 percent of the entire Black Sea surface.

On 10 July 2019, despite a coastal notification for seafarers regarding the closure of the area for conducting the international exercise Sea Breeze 2019, the destroyer Smetlivy, a ship of the Russian Black Sea Fleet, entered at about 08:00 on July 10, 2019, an area closed to navigation, where practical naval artillery shooting was conducted by a naval group of an international coalition, and provoked a dangerous situation.

In August 2019, Ukrainian Navy small reconnaissance ship Pereyaslav during their trip to Georgia to participate in exercise Agile Spirit 2019 and while in neutral waters, crew received a warning over the radio from a Russian navy ship. The Russians warned that the Ukrainians needed to turn away because the area was allegedly blocked. International coordinators did not confirm that fact, so the captain of the Pereyaslav decided to maintain the vessel along its original course. Soon thereafter, the Kasimov, a large Russian anti-submarine corvette, Project 1124M/Grisha V-class, was spotted near the Ukrainian ship. The Russian corvette's aggressive behavior only ceased when a Turkish reconnaissance plane arrived close to the Pereyaslav. This incident was filmed by a Ukrainian team of military journalists as part of the Ukrainian delegation participating in Agile Spirit 2019.

On 14 November 2019, during the Third International Conference for Maritime Security, in Odesa, Ukrainian Navy commander Admiral Ihor Voronchenko said that a Russian Tu-22M3 had been observed simulating the launch of a missile strike on this coastal city, Voronchenko added that Russian bombers had made several similar attempts during exercises on July 10, conducting a virtual airstrike 60 kilometers from Odesa.

See also 
List of ship losses during the Russo-Ukrainian War

References

Military history of the Black Sea
International maritime incidents
Russia–Ukraine military relations
Military history of Ukraine
Black Sea incidents
Black Sea incidents